The Panasonic Impulse is an American football team based in Kadoma, Osaka, Japan.  The Impulse compete in the X-League, and are a member of the top tier X1 Super division along with Fujitsu Frontiers, Obic Seagulls, IBM Big Blue, Nojima Sagamihara Rise, Elecom Kobe Finies, Tokyo Gas Creators, and All Mitsubishi Lions. The team currently holds 7 Japan X Bowl championship titles along with 4 Rice Bowl Championships.

Team history
1974 Team founded. Team known as the  Matsushita Electric Works Impulse
1995 Won first Tokyo Super Bowl title. Also won first Rice Bowl National Championship.
2004 Team celebrates 30th anniversary of founding. Won 2nd Rice Bowl National Championship.
2008 Team name changed to Panasonic Electric Works Impulse. Won 3rd Rice Bowl National Championship.
2011 Team name changed to Panasonic Impulse.
2015 Won 7th Japan X Bowl title and 4th Rice Bowl National Championship.

Seasons
{| class="wikitable"
|bgcolor="#FFCCCC"|X-League Champions (1987–present)
|bgcolor="#DDFFDD"|<small>Division Champions</small>
|bgcolor="#D0E7FF"|Final Stage/Semifinals Berth
|bgcolor="#96CDCD"|Wild Card /2nd Stage Berth
|}

Import playersCurrent import playersJapanese-American playersFormer import players'''

References

External links
  (Japanese)

American football in Japan
Panasonic
Kadoma District
1974 establishments in Japan
American football teams established in 1974
X-League teams